Gentryville is an unincorporated community in Gentry County, in the U.S. state of Missouri.

History
Gentry was platted in 1848, taking its name from Gentry County. A post office called Gentryville was established in 1846, and remained in operation until 1938.

References

Unincorporated communities in Gentry County, Missouri
Unincorporated communities in Missouri